Yatton is a village in Somerset, England.

Yatton may also refer to

 Yatton, Aymestrey in Herefordshire (near Leominster)
 Yatton, east Herefordshire (near Ross-on-Wye)
 Yatton, Ontario, Canada
 Yatton railway station, Somerset, England
 Yatton dæmoniac
 Yatton Keynell, Wiltshire, England